F.C. Atletico Montichiari is an Italian association football club, based in Montichiari, Lombardy. It currently plays in Serie D.

History
F.C. Atletico Montichiari was formed in 2012 by bought the sports title from A.C. Carpenedolo, in order to replace defunct team of the city, A.C. Montichiari folded in the same year.

Both Montichiari, Carpenedolo were the town from the Province of Brescia, thus the relocation was allowed by Norme organizzative interne of Italian Football Federation.

Colors and badge
The team's colors are red and blue.

References

External links
Official site 

Football clubs in Lombardy
Association football clubs established in 2012
2012 establishments in Italy
Province of Brescia